The Belagavi border dispute or Belgaon border dispute is a dispute between the Indian states of Karnataka and Maharashtra over which state Belagavi rightfully should be part of. Belagavi is now a district in Karnataka, but in British India, was part of the Bombay Presidency, together with present-day Gujarat, Maharashtra and certain areas of Karnataka.

History

Background
An 1881 census recorded a population of 864,014 residents in the Belagavi district. 556,397 (64.39 percent) of them were Kannada speakers and 225,008 (26.04 percent) spoke Marathi.

With the independence of India in 1947, the Belagavi district of the former Bombay Presidency became a part of Bombay State.  In 1956, the States Reorganization Act incorporated the Belagavi district into the newly formed Mysore state (now Karnataka). This placed Belagavi, with its majority of Marathi speakers, within the Kannada-majority Karnataka. Adjoining areas with mostly Marathi-speaking citizens were incorporated into a newly formed Maharashtra state.

Boundary Commission's decision
Belagavi historically has been a part of the Kannada region and has seen many Kannadiga dynasties ruling over it. The demographics of the region changed in the 18th century as in other parts of India. The period saw the expansion of the Maratha empire under the Peshwa, culminating in its geographic spread memorialized as being from "Attock to Cuttack". A large chunk of the Karnataka region became a part of the empire and was wrongly called the "Southern Maratha Country" (comprising most of North Karnataka, with its vast majority of Kannada speakers). When the British came to power, the region was dotted by remnants of the Maratha empire ruling over their jagirs and feudal states. The language of the land essentially remained Kannada. The prevailing situation was summed up by John Faithfull Fleet in The Dynasties of the Kanarese Districts of the Bombay Presidency (1894), which forms a part of the Gazetteer of the Bombay Presidency (Vol-1, Part-II, Book-III) thus:

.

This was the background available on Belagavi to the commission that decided the linguistic reorganisation of Indian states. As a result, Maharashtra didn't include the 'Maratha'-ruled areas of Baroda, Indore or Gwalior except for Kolhapur, as the Commission considered the historical changes in the region and not just recent changes in demography.

Four member committee
Following a memorandum from the Maharashtra government on 23 June 1957, the Government of India constituted the Mahajan Committee on 5 June 1960 to decide on the reorganisation of Belagavi. The four member Committee consisted of two representatives from the Maharashtra government and two from the Mysore government. However, it failed to reach an agreement.
Maharashtra wanted to adopt the following principles, and agreed to hand over Kannada majority villages to Mysore:
 Villages as a unit
 Geographical proximity/integrity
 Marathi or Kannada speakers "relative majority"; villages with no population should be merged with that state where the owners of that land reside
 The wish of the residents

The Mysore government, on the other hand, wanted status quo to be maintained.

Mahajan Commission
Maharashtra leader Senapati Bapat resorted to a hunger strike demanding that the government form a commission to address the border dispute. At Maharashtra's insistence, the Government of India constituted the Mahajan Commission on 25 October 1966.  V.P. Naik, Maharashtra's Chief Minister at that time, announced on 9 November 1967 that Maharashtra will adhere to the Mahajan Commission's report, regardless of the outcome. The commission was headed by the third Chief Justice of the Supreme Court of India, Meher Chand Mahajan. The commission, upon review of Maharashtra's claims, recommended the exchange of several villages in Belagavi district between the two states, but rejected Maharashtra's claim on Belgaum city.

The Mahajan Commission received 2,240 memoranda and interviewed 7,572 people before submitting its report. Maharashtra had asked for 814 villages besides Belagavi. It was given 262 villages including Nippani, Khanapur and Nandgad. Mysore State had claimed 516 villages, of which Maharashtra admitted that 260 were Kannada-speaking ones. It was awarded 247 villages including claim to Solapur.

Excerpts of the Mahajan Report
Excerpts from the Mahajan Commission report regarding the rejection of Maharashtra's claim over Belagavi:

The Mahajan commission report summarized its recommendations thus:

 Belgaum to continue in Karnataka
 Around 247 villages/places including Jatta, Akkalakote and Sholapur to be part of Karnataka
 Around 264 villages/places including Nandagad, Nippani and Khanapur to be part of Maharashtra
 Kasaragod (of Kerala) to be part of Karnataka

The Maharashtra and Kerala government rejected these recommendations and demanded their review. The Maharashtra government termed the findings of the reports biased and self-contradictory because the "formula" applied for Kasaragod was not applied for Belgaum. It insisted that the report is against the "wish of the people" of Belgaum. Kerala, on the other hand, refused to hand over Kasaragod to Karnataka. The Karnataka government continued to press for either the implementation of the report or the maintenance of status quo.

Maharashtra's arguments against the report
Maharashtra insisted on the 1951 census being used to resolve the dispute as it had arisen due to the States Reorganisation Act of 1956. According to the 1951 census the percentages of Marathi-speakers (with Kannada-speakers in brackets) were as follows:
 Belagavi city: 60% (18.8%)
 Shahapura: 57.0% (33.2%)
 Belagavi cantonment: 33.6% (20.6%)
 Belagavi suburbs: 50.9% (21.8%)

The Mahajan commission, however, used the census of 1961, according to which Belagavi was surrounded by Kannada speaking areas on all sides. The commission said that its decisions on border dispute were not based on the number of Marathi schools and students in Belagavi.

Political leaders in Maharashtra insisted that the Mahajan Commission report was not the final word on the dispute and Shiv Sena leader Ramdas Kadam claimed that even ex-prime minister Rajiv Gandhi had said so.
The Maharashtra Government rejected the Mahajan Commission's report claiming that it was biased, illogical and against the wishes of the people.

Emergence of the Maharashtra Ekikaran Samiti
The Maharashtra Ekikaran Samiti (MES) was founded in 1948 with the sole objective of ensuring that Belagavi becomes part of Maharashtra.

1980s and 1990s
The first Belagavi City Corporation (BCC) elections were held in December 1983. The MES-dominated BCC made demands for the transfer of Belgaum to Maharashtra in 1990, 1996 and 2001. More than 250 MES-dominated gram and taluk panchayats, and some other municipalities (such as neighbouring Khanapur) passed similar resolutions. In 1986, the dispute led to violence and large-scale arson, resulting in nine deaths in Belagavi.

During H.D. Deve Gowda's tenure as Chief Minister of Karnataka (1994–96), the Karnataka organisation, Kannada Cheluvarigara Sangha, submitted a memorandum to the Karnataka Government, asking it to set up large industries in the region to provide employment to 20,000-30,000 people.

Pro-Marathi groups protested against government notices and records not being available in Marathi. The Officials Language Act, 1963 and 1981, states that "areas where the linguistic minorities constitute 15 percent or more of the local population, arrangements have to be made to translate government circulars, orders, extracts and land records into the minority language". In a letter (DO No RB Kannada CR 09/2000-01), Belagavi's Deputy Commissioner, Shalini Rajneesh reasoned that while suitable instructions had been given to the local authorities for the translation of documents into Marathi, it did not happen because the staff was "overloaded with the basic work to be carried out in the official language, that is, Kannada".

2005-2007

BCC's 2005 resolution
On 27 October 2005, the MES-controlled BCC, amidst strong opposition by the Indian National Congress, Bharatiya Janata Party (BJP) and few independents, passed a resolution requesting the Karnataka State government and the Supreme Court of India to merge the disputed border areas in the districts of Belagavi (including Khanapura, Nippani and Belagavi city), Uttara Kannada (including Karwar and Haliyal) and Bidar (including Bhalki, Aurad and Basavakalyan) with Maharashtra. The entire opposition, including Congress, BJP and a few independents, boycotted the meeting. The meeting also witnessed intense verbal clashes between the MES and the opposition. Assistant Executive Officer, N.D. Achanur advised MES members not to pass a resolution against the interest of the state. When MES members refused to heed his advice, the officer walked out of the office. The officials of various departments present to provide details of their departments also walked out.

Some members of Karnataka group called Kannada Rakshana Vedike manhandled the BCC mayor Vijay More, former mayor Shivaji Sunthakar and former legislator B I Patil, outside the Karnataka Legislators' Home in Bangalore. The attackers tore Vijay More's shirt and daubed him with black paint.

On 10 November, the Mayor was served with a showcause notice by the Karnataka Government asking why the resolution should not be cancelled under Section 98 and 99 of the KMC Act. On 17 November, the government cancelled the resolution, without waiting for the Mayor's reply. On 17 November, it served another notice that sought an explanation from the Mayor as to why the BCC should not be dissolved under Section 99 of the KMC Act.

On 19 November, T N Chaturvedi, the Governor of Karnataka, criticised BCC during a public function. A group of Kannada organisations set 22 November as the deadline for dissolving BCC and threatened to call a statewide bandh on 24 November. On 21 November 2005, the Karnataka government dissolved the council, under pressure from Kannada activists, citing the violation of Section 18 of the KMC Act.

The MES secretary, Maloji Astekar, insisted that the BCC resolution was in accordance with the provisions of the KMC Act, 1976, and Fundamental Rights enshrined under Article 19(1) of the Constitution of India. He accused the Karnataka Government of "step-motherly treatment". The legal team of MES pointed out that both the cancellation of the resolution and the dissolution of the council were done without giving 15 days' time as was stipulated in the notice to enable the Mayor to submit his explanations. MES called a bandh in protest. A delegation of MES leaders visited Mumbai and met Maharashtra leaders, including Chief Minister Vilasrao Deshmukh. Deshmukh wrote letters to Karnataka Chief Minister N. Dharam Singh and Prime Minister Dr. Manmohan Singh expressing displeasure over the action taken against the BCC.

The former mayor of Belagavi, Vijay More, a Dalit, broke down in front of the media in Mumbai while describing the atrocities perpetrated on him by 30 Kannada fanatics in front of the Vidhana Soudha in Bengaluru. Vasant Patil, former Belagavi MLA, claimed that for the past several decades the Marathi-speaking population of Belagavi (population 5 lakh) had endured a host of atrocities by successive governments of Karnataka. "But we are determined to get justice", he added.

MES's legal challenge to the dissolution
After the MES-headed Belagavi City Corporation (BCC) was dissolved, the MES said that it would challenge the move in the Karnataka High Court, claiming that it discriminated against Marathi-speaking people. The MES had 49 corporators in the 58-strong civic body. The BCC was dissolved on several grounds, including passing a resolution seeking merger of Marathi-speaking areas in the border district with Maharashtra. Pre-empting the MES move, the Karnataka Government filed a caveat in the High Court, requesting it not to pass any order without hearing its counsel. The MES said that the government was hasty in taking such a decision when the state boundary case was still pending in the Supreme Court. MES working president Deepak Dalvi alleged that they "were being treated like slaves and hence will go to the High Court for justice" and the state government's action was "an assault on democracy". "A civic body elected by the people of Belagavi has been dissolved in an undemocratic manner. The unilateral decision has once again exposed the government's step-motherly treatment of Marathi-speaking people of Belagavi district", he added.

No developments on this particular litigation have been reported since its announcement.

MES changes stance
Fearing the dissolution of Belagavi taluk panchayat, the MES changed its stance and told the government that it had 'just discussed the issue and not passed a resolution'. All 22 members who were issued showcause notices provided the same response to the government notice. The members also asked the government not to take any action, including termination of the elected body.

Maharashtra's petition in the Supreme Court
In December 2005, attempts were also made by the Congress-led government at the centre to re-initiate discussions on the dispute between the Chief Ministers of Maharashtra and Karnataka and the Prime Minister Manmohan Singh. This effort proved futile as Karnataka continued to press for the implementation of the report and Maharashtra continued to stake its claim on Belagavi City and a few other parts of Karnataka.

Finally, on 15 March 2006, the Maharashtra government filed a petition in the Supreme Court of India, staking a claim over Belagavi City. It cited "the feeling of insecurity among the Marathi speaking people living in Karnataka, in the recent days". Belagavi district along with Belagavi city continues to be a part of Karnataka state while Maharashtra awaits the Supreme Court's verdict.

2006 developments

Maharashtra demands that the border region be brought under the centre's rule
Maharashtra asked that the 865 disputed villages including Belagavi be placed under the central government's rule until the Supreme Court's final verdict. N.D Patil, the head of the legal committee appointed by the Maharashtra government, said that Karnataka is intensifying the problem. He added that Marathi people of border region are not able to live with honour and dignity under Karnataka's rule pointing to the 'unconstitutional' dissolution of Belagavi municipal council and manhandling of Belagavi mayor by Kannada activists in Bengaluru.

Karnataka Government's Assembly session
On 25 September 2006, amidst vociferous protests by MES, the Karnataka state government convened a five-day Assembly session, for the first time outside capital Bengaluru, in Belagavi to assert its hold over the city.

The Karnataka Government declared that Belagavi will be made Karnataka's second capital but subsequently Karnataka home minister denied it. The Chief Minister H D Kumaraswamy declared that the joint legislative session will be held every year in Belagavi, and a mini Vidhana Soudha (state secretariat) will be built in the city.

The Houses unanimously adopted a resolution, endorsing the Mahajan Commission report which declared Belagavi a part of Karnataka. This was the fifth time that Karnataka has passed such a resolution, the first being in 1967 when S Nijalingappa was the CM.

The Congress, the opposition party at the time, dubbed the Belagavi session "a gimmick and a waste of funds". Ironically, the decision to hold the legislative session at Belagavi was taken by the previous Dharam Singh government, when Congress was in power.

MES Mahamelava
On the same day that the Karnataka Assembly session convened in Belagavi, the MES organised a mahamelava ("The Great Meet-up"), which received a huge response. The mahamelava was attended by the Maharashtra deputy Chief Minister, R. R. Patil and many leaders from Shiv Sena, NCP and MES. Speaking to a gathering of about 50,000 people, R.R. Patil stated that if Belagavi and other Marathi-speaking areas were not merged with Maharashtra there would be no alternative but to take to the streets. R R Patil said that "public opinion cannot be changed by using police force. Never in world history has anyone been able to change public opinion through use of force". The convention was intended to send a strong message "to all concerned" that the 10 crore people of Maharashtra were with the Marathi-speaking populace of the border areas in their "struggle". The leaders ridiculed the Karnataka Government's assembly session and vowed to merge Belagavi and adjoining areas into Maharashtra.

The Karnataka Government condemned R R Patil's address. It announced that Belgaum (Belgaon in Marathi) will be renamed to Belagavi.

Karnataka bandh
Karnataka Border Agitation Committee, an umbrella body of pro-Kannada outfits, called a statewide bandh in Karnataka in October 2006 to press for the implementation of Mahajan Commission report and to protest what the organisers called "step-motherly" treatment of the state by the centre. The Karnataka Chief Minister H D Kumaraswamy's appeal to call off the bandh was turned down by the organizers. BJP and JD(S), the ruling coalition partners in Karnataka extended their support to the bandh. The bandh affected normal life in Bengaluru and other parts of Karnataka.

The bandh was total in most parts of Karnataka except coastal districts and Tumakuru. In Bangalore, the bandh was total and incident free. Information technology and BPO industries in Bangalore closed their facilities for the day, especially due to non-availability of public transport and disruption of traffic by activists supporting the bandh. Kannada Rakshana Vedike members allegedly tore Marathi signboards and saffron flags and forced the residents of Belagavi to close their businesses. MES alleged that the Karnataka bandh was backed by Karnataka Police. Karnataka Police later arrested many Marathi residents, who expressed displeasure as the police did not take action against Kannada chauvinists. Maharashtra home minister R.R.Patil warned that torture against Marathi speakers would result in an equivalent response by them.

Yuvamelava
Maharashtra Ekikaran Samiti organised a youth convention at Khanapura on 26 October 2006. It was well received and attended by Maharashtra's leader of opposition, Ramdas Kadam and state minister, Hassan Mushrif. Marathi residents in the border region once again resolved to merge with Maharashtra. Kadam warned Karnataka that atrocities against Maharashtrians will result in a similar response against Kannadigas in Maharashtra. 

MES leaders said the success of mahamelava forced Karnataka to cancel its decision to make Belagavi the second capital. The situation was tense in Khanapura because of the violence that erupted when MES activists tried to remove Kannada boards from shops. The posters and boards Marathi youth were carrying in the name of the Melava portrayed Kannadigas in poor light. Violence was sparked when attendants clashed with police during the event. Police had to resort to lathis and shells to disperse the mob when the youth pelted stones at police. More than 50 people were injured and about 25 vehicles were damaged. Police allegedly went from house to house to search for and book miscreants. MES activists tried to set buses on fire on two occasions, and threw stones at people and shops. The situation was also tense in Macche and Ganebail near Belagavi as some pro-Maharashtrians hurled stones at the vehicles coming from Khanapura. The police beat up participants in MES Yuvamelava and arrested MES leaders and Marathi speakers to ensure a peaceful 'Rajyotsava day' which MES planned to mark as a "Black Day".

The police department framed charges against Ramdas Kadam, opposition leader of Maharashtra assembly and several other Marathi leaders for making inflammatory speeches against Karnataka and Kannadigas at the Yuva Melava. The police booked cases against Ramdas Kadam under section 153, 153(A), Indian Penal Code(IPC), which would put Kadam in jail for 3 years if convicted. Similar charges were framed against Nitin B Patil from Satara. As many as 85 people responsible for violence including MES working president Deepak Dalvi, were sent to 14-day judicial custody.

Hearing of the Supreme Court

The Supreme Court began its hearing on Maharashtra's petition on 17 January 2007.

Recent (2022- )
In December, 2022 Union Minister of Home Affairs, Amit Shah held meeting with both State's Chief Ministers. Both states agreed to form joint penal to see the issue. The Joint penal will include 6 observing ministers(3 from each state).

While a separate committee headed by an IAS officer will monitor law and order in the district.

On 27 December 2022, Maharashtra Legislative Assembly passed an unanimous resolution over border dispute with Karnataka. The resolution includes Belgaum, Nippani, Karwar, Bidar, Bhalki cities with 865 Marathi-speaking villages of Karnataka to be part of Maharashtra and for this Maharashtra Government will pursuit legal proceedings in Supreme Court.

References

External links
 Belagavi merger: flogging a dead horse

Belagavi district
History of Karnataka (1947–present)
History of Maharashtra (1947–present)
Inter-state disputes in India
Internal borders of India
Internal territorial disputes
Politics of Karnataka
Politics of Maharashtra
Reorganisation of Indian states